This is a list of Nicaraguans and people of Nicaraguan ethnicity:

Art
Omar D'Leon (1928–2022), painter and poet.
Franck de Las Mercedes (born 1972), painter.
Armando Morales (1927–2011), painter.
Hugo Palma-Ibarra (born 1942), painter.
Róger Pérez de la Rocha (born 1949), painter.
 Julia Casimira Sacasa, (born 1972), abstract painter, sculptor, poet. CASIMIRA

Business
Harry Brautigam (1948–2008), economist, banker and academic.
José Cardenal (born 1940), businessman.
Michael Cordúa (born 1961), restaurateur, entrepreneur, businessman, award-winning self-taught chef.
Carlos Reynaldo Lacayo (born 1950), businessman.
Alejandro Lacayo (born 1951), businessman.
Carlos Pellas Chamorro (born 1953), businessman, entrepreneur, Nicaragua's first billionaire.
Alfonso Robelo (born 1939), businessman, politician, diplomat who served as ambassador to Costa Rica.
Patrick Frawley Peugnet Jr.
https://en.m.wikipedia.org/wiki/Patrick_Frawley#

Education
 Elena Arellano Chamorro (1836–1911), reform pedagogue, a pioneer for education of women.
 Josefa Toledo de Aguerri (1866–1962), reform pedagogue, general director of education in the 1920s.

Fashion, models and beauty queens 
 Xiomara Blandino (born 1984), Miss Nicaragua 2007, model.
 Nastassja Bolivar, Nuestra Belleza Latina 2011 – Miss Nicaragua 2013 – and Top 16 in Miss Universe 2013 -The Best National Costume.
 Iva Grijalva Pashova (born 1986), Miss Earth Nicaragua 2007.
 Beatriz Obregon Lacayo, Miss Nicaragua 1977
 Thelma Rodríguez (born 1989), Miss Nicaragua 2008.

Government and politics 

.
 Lila T. Abaunza (1929–2008), First Lady of Nicaragua from 2002 to 2007.
 Fernando Agüero (born 1920), politician.
 Arnoldo Alemán (born 1946), former president of Nicaragua from 1997 to 2002.
 Leonardo Arguello Barreto (1895–1947), President of Nicaragua (1947).
 Miguel d'Escoto Brockmann (born 1933), former Foreign Minister of Nicaragua (1979–1990), President of the 63rd UN General Assembly (2008–2009) and leading liberation theologian.
 Juan Bautista Sacasa (1874–1946), President of Nicaragua from 1933 to 1936.
 Claudia Bermúdez (born 1954), Nicaragua-American politician and entrepreneur; first Nicaraguan American to be the nominee of a major party for a seat in the United States Congress.
 Enrique Bolaños (1928–2021), President of Nicaragua from 2002 to 2007. 
 Róger Calero (born 1969), Nicaraguan American who ran for U.S. President in the 2004 elections.
 Adolfo Calero (1931–2012), leader of the Contra-Revolutionary Movement.
 Emiliano Chamorro (1871–1966), President of Nicaragua from 1917 to 1920 and part of 1926.
 Fruto Chamorro (1804–1855), first president of Nicaragua 1854–1855.
 Manuel Coronel Kautz, vice minister of foreign relations.
 Arturo Cruz (born 1923), politician and diplomat.
 Pedro Joaquín Chamorro Alfaro (1875–1879), President of Nicaragua from 1875 to 1879.
 Violeta Chamorro (born 1929), first female president in Latin America, second in North America and 48th President of Nicaragua.
 Adolfo Díaz (1875–1964), President of Nicaragua in 1911–1917 and 1926–1929.
 George William Albert Hendy (1879–1888), Hereditary Chief of Miskito Nation.
 Edmundo Jarquín (born 1946), politician, candidate for president of Nicaragua in 2006.
 Máximo Jerez (1818–1881), politician, lawyer, and military leader in 19th century Nicaragua.
 Herty Lewites (1939–2006), politician.
 Angel Bravo Lorio, politician, Communist Party of Nicaragua
 Eduardo Montealegre (1955), politician, businessman.
 Oldman (died 1687), King of the Miskito Nation from 1625 to 1687.
 Daniel Ortega (born 1945), current President of Nicaragua, leader of the FSLN.
 Edén Pastora (1937–2020), politician.
 Mariano Prado (1776–1837), lawyer and a four-time, liberal chief of state of El Salvador.
 Sergio Ramírez (born 1943), Vice President of Nicaragua during the Junta, writer, intellectual.
 Jorge Salazar Argüello (1939–1980), Nicaraguan coffee grower and popular leader of UPANIC (Union of Agricultural Producers of Nicaragua – Unión de Productores Agropecuarios de Nicaragua), seemed poised to become the leader of the opposition to the Sandinista government, until his death at the hands of State Security forces.
 José Santos Zelaya (1853–1919), president of Nicaragua from 1893 to 1909.
 Guillermo Sevilla-Sacasa (1908–1997), Ambassador of Nicaragua to the United States (1943–1979), Dean of the Diplomatic Corps (1958–1979), Washington, DC
 Hilda Solis (born 1957), U.S. congresswoman.
 Anastasio Somoza García (1896–1956), 34th and 39th President of Nicaragua
 Anastasio Somoza Debayle (1925–1980), 44th and 45th President of Nicaragua from 1967 to 1972 and from 1974 to 1979. 
 Luis Somoza Debayle (1922–1967), 40th President of Nicaragua from 1956 to 1963.
 Jose Santos Zelaya (1853–1919), president.

Journalism 
 Pedro Joaquín Chamorro Cardenal (1924–1978), editor of La Prensa daily newspaper, assassinated.
 Xavier Chamorro Cardenal (1932–2008), co-founder, director and editor of El Nuevo Diario.
 Enrique Gottel (1831–1875), journalist, music composer, and historian.
 Mari Ramos, weather anchor for CNN.

Literature 

 Claribel Alegría (1924–2018), poet, she received the Neustadt International Prize for Literature in 2006.
 Emilio Álvarez Lejarza (1884–1969), writer.
 Emilio Álvarez Montalván (1919–2014), political writer.
 Eugenio Batres Garcia (born 1941) noted newscaster and journalist, writer, author and poet.
 Gioconda Belli (born 1948), poet and writer.
 Yolanda Blanco (born 1954), poet and translator.
 Tomás Borge (1930–2012), writer, poet, politician and essayist.
 Omar Cabezas (born 1950), writer.
 Ernesto Cardenal (1925–2020), poet.
 Blanca Castellón (born 1958), poet.
 José Coronel Urtecho (1906–1994), poet, translator, essayist, critic, narrator, playwright and historian.
 Alfonso Cortés (1893–1969), poet.
 Arturo Cruz (born 1954), writer.
 Pablo Antonio Cuadra (1912–2002), poet.
 Rubén Darío (1867–1916), poet, referred to as The Father of Modernism.
 Karly Gaitán Morales (born 1980) film historian, writer, journalist.
 Salomón Ibarra Mayorga (1887–1985), poet and lyricist of "Salve a ti, Nicaragua", the Nicaraguan national anthem.
 Erwin Krüger (1915–1973), poet and composer.
 Rigoberto López Pérez (1929–1936), poet and writer.
 Francisco Mayorga (born 1949), writer.
 Christianne Meneses Jacobs (born 1971), writer, editor, and publisher.
 Rosario Murillo (born 1951), poet.
 Azarías H. Pallais (1884–1954), poet.
 Joaquín Pasos (1914–1947), poet.
 Horacio Peña (born 1946), writer and poet.
 Sergio Ramírez (born 1942), writer.
 Mariana Sansón Argüello (1918–2002), poet.
 Arlen Siu (1955–1972), essayist.
 Julio Valle Castillo (born 1952), poet, novelist, essayist, and a critic of literature and art.
 Daisy Zamora (born 1950), poet.

Military and police 
 Enrique Bermúdez (1932–1991), military and political leader of the Nicaraguan Contras from 1979 to 1991.
 Fernando Chamorro Alfaro (1824–1863), general and member of the governing junta of Nicaragua (1860–1863).
 Aminta Granera (born 1952), police chief of Nicaragua.
 Aristides Sánchez (died 1993), key figure among the Contras.
 Anastasio Somoza Portocarrero (born 1951), former commander of the National Guard.

Movies and TV entertainment 
 Maurice Benard (born 1963), actor on American soap operas All My Children and General Hospital
 Barbara Carrera (born 1945), film, TV actress, former model.
 Oswaldo Castillo, actor, most notable role includes the one in The Hammer.
 Edward'O, notable astroanalyst and co-host of Telemundo's dating show, 12 Corazones.
 Gabriel Traversari (born 1963), actor, director, writer, singer, songwriter and painter.
Gabriela Revilla, writer, producer, director

Music 

 José Areas (born 1946), percussionist, former drummer for Santana.
 Lya Barrioz, singer and actress.
 Katia Cardenal (born 1963), singer-songwriter from Duo Guardabarranco.
 Dimension Costeña, musicians.
 Erwin Krüger (1915–1973), singer and Nicaraguan folklore poet.
 Luis Enrique Mejía López (born 1962), salsa singer and music composer.
 Carlos Mejía Godoy (born 1943), musician, composer, singer.
 Alfonso Noel Lovo (born 1951), composer and guitarist.
 Tony Melendez (born 1962), guitar player, singer and Christian rock songwriter who was born without arms.
 Maria Mena, Norwegian/Nicaraguan pop singer.
 Otto Benjamín de la Rocha López (born 1933), singer, songwriter and radio actor.
 T-Bone (born 1973), rapper.
 Torombolo (born 1985), reggaeton and hip hop singer.
  Mario Sacasa, singer, songwriter, guitarist
 J Smooth, bilingual hip hop and Reggaeton singer.
 Donald Vega (born 1974), jazz musician and composer.
 Hernaldo Zúñiga (born 1955), singer and music composer.

Non-Governmental Organizations 
 Reinaldo Aguado Montealegre (born 1960), President of the International Society for Human Rights in Nicaragua.
 Aubry Campbell Ingram (1903–2000), baseball player who helped found the Asociación de Scouts de Nicaragua.
 Myrna Cunningham, Miskita indigenous rights activist and physician.
 Joseph A. Harrison (1883–1964), Moravian Pastor who helped start the first scout troop in Nicaragua.
 Bianca Jagger (born 1945), social and political activist, former wife of Mick Jagger.
  Mario Sacasa, Director, Future of Nicaragua Foundation, Fundación Futuro de Nicaragua

Religion 

 Reyna I. Aburto (born 1963), religious leader of the Church of Jesus Christ of Latter-day Saints
 Leopoldo Brenes (born 1949), Archbishop of Managua, cardinal.
 Ernesto Cardenal (born 1925), Catholic priest and liberation theologian.
 Fernando Cardenal (born 1934), Jesuit priest, director at the Fe y Alegría organization in Managua.
  Miguel D'Escoto Brockmann (1933–2017), Roman Catholic priest, former foreign minister of Nicaragua, received the Lenin Peace Prize in 1985.
  Uriel Molina Oliú (born 1932), Franciscan priest.
 Pablo Antonio Vega Mantilla (1919–2007), Roman Catholic bishop and bishop Emeritus.
 Maria Romero Meneses (1902–1977), Salesian nun, beatified in 2002.
 Miguel Obando y Bravo (born 1926), archbishop emeritus of Managua, cardinal.
 Jesus Rojas (1950–1991), Jesuit priest.

Revolutionaries 

 Patrick Argüello (1943–1970), Popular Front for the Liberation of Palestine.
 Nora Astorga (1948–1988), Sandinista revolutionary, lawyer, politician, judge and Nicaraguan ambassador to the UN.
 Antonio Cardenal Caldera (1951–1991), also known as Jesus Rojas, major leader of the Farabundo Martí National Liberation Front.
 Arturo Cruz, Jr. (born 1954), revolutionary, writer, professor and diplomat.
 Rigoberto Cruz (died 1967), one of the founders of the FSLN.
 Ajax Delgado (1941–1960), student activist of the Sandinista revolution.
 José Dolores Estrada (1792–1869), famed for his part in the battle Hacienda San Jacinto in 1856.
 Idania Fernandez (1952–1979), Sandinista revolutionary.
 Carlos Fonseca (1936–1976), teacher, founder of FSLN.
 Maximo Jerez (1818–1876), lawyer, politician, general, president.
 Augusto César Sandino (1895–1934), revolutionary, symbol of the FSLN.
 Arlen Siu (1955–1972), Sandinista revolutionary.
 Dora María Téllez (born 1947), Sandinista revolutionary, founded the MRS, historian.

Science 

 Clodomiro Picado Twight (1887–1944), Pasteur Institute, biologists whose work on molds was a precursor to the formal discovery of penicillin.

Sports

Baseball 
 Porfirio Altamirano (born 1952), former Major League Baseball player.
 Marvin Benard (born 1970), former Major League Baseball player.
 Everth Cabrera (born 1986), Major League Baseball player.
 Tony Chévez (born 1954), Major League Baseball player.
 Cheslor Cuthbert (born 1992), Major League Baseball player.
 David Green (born 1960), former Major League Baseball player.
 Devern Hansack (born 1978), current Major League Baseball player.
 Wilton López (born 1983), former Major League Baseball player.
 Oswaldo Mairena (born 1975), Major League Baseball player.
 Dennis Martínez (born 1955), first Nicaraguan to play in Major League Baseball, pitched the 13th ever perfect game in major league history.
 Vicente Padilla (born 1977), current Major League Baseball player.
 Erasmo Ramirez (born 1990), Major League Baseball player.
 J. C. Ramirez (born 1988), Major League Baseball player.

Boxing 
 Román González (born 1987), boxer, world champion.
 José Alfaro (born 1983), boxer, world champion.
 Rosendo Alvarez (born 1970), boxer, former world champion, only person to hold the undefeated flyweight champion to a draw.
 Alexis Argüello (1952-2009), boxer, former world champion.
 Julio Gamboa (born 1971), lightweight boxer.
 Eddie Gazo (born 1950), super welterweight boxer.
 Ricardo Mayorga (born 1973), boxer, former WBA/WBC Welterweight champion and WBC Junior Middleweight world champion.
 David Obregon (born 1978), professional boxer.
 Juan Palacios (born 1980), professional boxer, reigning WBC Interim Minimumweight World champion.
 Luis Alberto Pérez (born 1978), boxer, current IBF world junior-bantamweight champion.
 Adonis Rivas (born 1972), boxer, former world champion.
 Roberto Arriaza (born 1990) former WBO NABF Welterweight champion.
 Yokasta Valle (born 1992), current female IBF mini flyweight champion.

Football (soccer) 
 Armando Collado (born 1985), professional soccer player.
 Denis Espinoza (born 1983), professional soccer player.
 Shawn Hasani Martin (born 1987), professional soccer player.
 Emilio Palacios (born 1982), professional soccer player, Nicaraguan to score a hat-trick in an international competition.
 Wilber Sanchez (born 1979), professional soccer player.
 Samuel Wilson (born 1983), professional soccer player who currently plays for Atletico Olanchano.

Martial arts 
 Diana López (born 1984), Olympic bronze medalist in the sport of taekwondo.
 Mark López (born 1982), Olympic silver medalist in the sport of taekwondo.
 Steven López (born 1978), first official Olympic gold medalist in the sport of taekwondo.
 Jason González (born 1990), fighter in the UFC Lightweight division

Swimming 
 Claudia Poll (born 1972), swimmer, won the gold medal at the 1996 Summer Olympics.
 Silvia Poll (born 1970), swimmer, won the silver medal at the 1988 Summer Olympics.

Other sports 
 Jessica Aguilera (born 1985), track and field sprint athlete, competed in the 2008 Beijing Olympics.
 Karla Moreno (born 1988), weightlifter, competed in the 2008 Beijing Olympics.

References

 01